Harry Becher  was a long serving Irish Anglican priest, most notably Dean of Ross from 1919  to 1926.

The Head Master of St Paul's School, Stony Stratford, Becher was ordained deacon in 1883 and priest in 1884. After a curacy at Lislee he held incumbencies at Castlehaven and Rosscarbery.

References

Deans of Ross, Ireland
19th-century Irish Anglican priests
20th-century Irish Anglican priests